The Center for Applied Research in the Apostolate (CARA) is a national, non-profit, applied social science research center, affiliated with Georgetown University, that studies Catholicism and the Catholic Church. The center opened in March 1965 under its first president, Cardinal John Cody, then archbishop of New Orleans.

History

The Center traces its origins to the 1950s, when superiors of U.S. missionary institutes called for a national "Catholic center for coordinated research and cooperation in all things pertaining to mission and international development of the Church."   In 1961 the Archbishop of Boston, Cardinal Richard Cushing, urged an examination of the feasibility of such an institution. With the Second Vatican Council, the concept of mission was expanded to encompass the total mission of the Church.  Subsequent meetings led to the incorporation of CARA in August 1963 with its first staff in place by 1964.

In October 1965 Cardinal Cody announced the existence of the Center at a national meeting of Catholic Bishops, noting that the Center "exists to provide for us the reliable scientific and technical information we require for proper and thoughtful decisions in the very complicated areas of our ministry."

Activities 

As an applied social science research center, CARA has produced many surveys; program reviews; archival, historical, and other research for a wide range of organizations ranging from the U. S. Conference of Catholic Bishops to individual dioceses, parishes, and religious institutes.  Since its founding, the Center has produced nearly 2,000 research reports.

References

External links

Catholic organizations